The Sohm Abyssal Plain is in the North Atlantic and has an area of around .

References

Abyssal plains
Landforms of the Atlantic Ocean